Piagol is a 1955 South Korean film directed by Lee Kang-cheon. It deals with a North Korean army unit that refuses to accept the armistice that effectively ended the Korean War in 1953. Instead, they hole up around Mt. Jiri and continue to operate. It is based on real historical events.
It was initially banned due to its supposedly "pro-communist" content, but the director launched a protest to have the film re-released.

Cast
Kim Jin-kyu as Cheol-su
Heo Jang-kang as Man-su
No Kyeong-hie as Ae-ran
Lee Ye-chun as Agari, Boss
Yun Wang-guk
Kim Yeong Hui as Soju

External links

South Korean war drama films
1950s Korean-language films
1955 films
Korean War films
Films critical of communism
1950s war drama films
South Korean black-and-white films